The 1982 Marshall Thundering Herd football team was an American football team that represented Marshall University in the Southern Conference (SoCon) during the 1982 NCAA Division I-AA football season. In its fourth season under head coach Sonny Randle, the team compiled a 3–8 record (1–6 against conference opponents) and played its home games at Fairfield Stadium in Huntington, West Virginia.

Schedule

References

Marshall
Marshall Thundering Herd football seasons
Marshall Thundering Herd football